84 (eighty-four) is the natural number following 83 and preceding 85.

In mathematics 

84 is:

 the sum of the first seven triangular numbers (making it a tetrahedral number).
 a Dodecahedral number.
 the sum of a twin prime (41 + 43).
 a semiperfect number, being thrice a perfect number.
 a palindromic number and a repdigit in bases 11 (7711), 13 (6613), 20 (4420), 27 (3327), and 41 (2241).
 the lim sup of the largest finite subgroup of the mapping class group of a genus g surface divided by g.

A hepteract is a seven-dimensional hypercube with 84 penteract 5-faces.

In astronomy 
Messier object M84, a magnitude 11.0 lenticular galaxy in the constellation Virgo
The New General Catalogue object NGC 84, a single star in the constellation Andromeda

In other fields 

Eighty-four is also:

 The year AD 84, 84 BC, or 1984.
 The atomic number of polonium
 The model number of Harpoon missile
 WGS 84 - The latest revision of the World Geodetic System, a fixed global reference frame for the Earth.
 The house number of 84 Avenue Foch
 The number of the French department Vaucluse
 The code for international direct dial phone calls to Vietnam
 The town of Eighty Four, Pennsylvania
 The company 84 Lumber
 The ISBN Group Identifier for books published in Spain
 A variation of the game 42 played with two sets of dominoes.
 The film 84 Charing Cross Road (1987) starring Anne Bancroft and Anthony Hopkins
 KKNX Radio 84 in Eugene, Oregon
 The B-Side to "Up All Night" (Take That song)
 British Army term for the 84mm Carl Gustav recoilless rifle.
 How many Earth years it takes Uranus to orbit the sun once
 The total number of Vertcoin to be released is 84 million “Vertcoin”

See also
 List of highways numbered 84

References

Integers